Ilistra was a town of ancient Lycaonia, inhabited in Roman and Byzantine times. It was on the road from Laranda to Isaura, which is still in existence. Ilistra became a seat of a bishop; no longer a residential bishopric, it remains a titular see of the Roman Catholic Church.

Its site is located near Yollarbaşı, Karaman Province, Turkey.

References

Populated places in ancient Lycaonia
Catholic titular sees in Asia
Former populated places in Turkey
Roman towns and cities in Turkey
Populated places of the Byzantine Empire
History of Karaman Province